Vitacea polistiformis, the grape root borer, is a moth of the family Sesiidae. It is found throughout the midwest of the United States, south to Florida and Texas. It is the most serious threat to grapes in Florida.

Adults are brown with thin yellow bands on the abdomen and resemble paper wasps. The front wings are brown while hind wings are transparent.

The larvae feed on grape species. The eggs hatch on the soil surface and the larvae tunnels into the root system of their host plant. The damage causes reduces vine growth, smaller leaves and reduced berry size. It can reduce productivity as much as 47%. Scientists are exploring the possibility of using soil acoustics to locate and combat  infestations of pests.

Gallery

References

External links

mothphotographersgroup

Sesiidae
Moths described in 1854